Kim Young-Mu (born September 3, 1984) is a South Korean football player who played for Daegu FC as a goalkeeper.

Club career 

Kim was drafted from Soongsil University for Daegu FC's 2007 season.   Although Baek Min-Cheol was the first choice keeper for Daegu FC, Kim would play three games in 2007, conceding 11 goals.  Kim remained on the roster for the 2008 season,   but left the club without playing a game that season.

Club career statistics

References

External links

1984 births
Living people
Association football goalkeepers
South Korean footballers
Daegu FC players
K League 1 players